East Park Township is a township in Marshall County, Minnesota, United States. The population was 19 at the 2000 census.

East Park Township was organized in 1899.

Geography

Demographics
As of the census of 2000, there were 19 people, 7 households, and 4 families residing in the township. The population density was 0.6 people per square mile (0.2/km2). There were 16 housing units at an average density of 0.5/sq mi (0.2/km2). The racial makeup of the township was 94.74% White, and 5.26% from two or more races.

There were 7 households, out of which 57.1% had children under the age of 18 living with them, 71.4% were married couples living together, and 28.6% were non-families. 28.6% of all households were made up of individuals, and 14.3% had someone living alone who was 65 years of age or older. The average household size was 2.71 and the average family size was 3.40.

In the township the population was spread out, with 36.8% under the age of 18, 5.3% from 18 to 24, 36.8% from 25 to 44, 5.3% from 45 to 64, and 15.8% who were 65 years of age or older. The median age was 32 years. For every 100 females, there were 90.0 males. For every 100 females age 18 and over, there were 100.0 males.

The median income for a household in the township was $16,250, and the median income for a family was $11,250. Males had a median income of $21,250 versus $16,250 for females. The per capita income for the township was $7,750. Below the poverty line were 25.0% of people, 33.3% of families, 33.3% of those under 18 and none of those over 64.

References

Townships in Marshall County, Minnesota
Townships in Minnesota